The 2022–23 Ligue Magnus season is the 102nd season of the Ligue Magnus, the top level of ice hockey in France. The regular season commenced on 8 September 2022, and is planned to finish on 3 March 2023.

Teams

Regular season

Standings

Results

Statistics

Scoring leaders 
The following players led the league in points, at the conclusion of matches played on 10 September 2022.

Leading goaltenders 
The following goaltenders led the league in goals against average, provided that they have played at least 70% of their team's minutes, at the conclusion of matches played on 10 September 2022.

References

External links 
Official website
Ligue Magnus on eurohockey.com
Ligue Magnus on eliteprospects.com

1
Fra
Ligue Magnus seasons